The Eritrea national football team represents Eritrea in men's international football and it is controlled by the Eritrean National Football Federation (ENFF). It is nicknamed the Red Sea Boys. It has never qualified for the finals of the FIFA World Cup and the Africa Cup of Nations. Local side Red Sea FC are the main supplier for the national team, The team represents both FIFA and Confederation of African Football (CAF).

History
An Eritrean team participated in a friendly tournament in Sudan in 1992, the year before Eritrea achieved independence. Eritrea participated in the 1994 CECAFA Cup, organised by the Council for East and Central Africa Football Association, even though the ENFF was not founded until 1996. The first full international was in the 1999 CECAFA Cup, the year after the ENFF joined the CAF and FIFA. They participated in the qualifying rounds of the 2000 African Cup of Nations and the 2002 World Cup, and subsequent editions until 2008. They have also appeared intermittently in the CECAFA Cup.

In the 2000 Africa Cup of Nations qualifiers, Eritrea managed a scoreless home draw versus Cameroon and a 1–0 home win over Mozambique. They finished second in their three team group, and advanced to a playoff round where they faced Senegal and Zimbabwe, but ultimately lost all four matches in that final stage.

In the first round of the qualifiers for the 2002 World Cup, they were drawn against Nigeria, and were defeated 4–0 in the away leg, after a goalless draw at home. The coach was Yilmaz Yuceturk.

In the first round of the 2006 World Cup qualifiers, Sudan was Eritrea's first round opponent. Eritrea lost the first leg 3–0, before another goalless draw in Asmara. The coach was Eritrean Tekie Abraha.

In group 6 of the qualifiers for the 2008 Africa Cup of Nations, under the guidance of Romanian Dorian Marin, Eritrea finished second behind Angola, failing to qualify for the final tournament. They beat Kenya twice and drew at home to Angola.

In the first round of the 2014 World Cup qualifiers, Eritrea faced Rwanda. The first leg in Asmara ended in a 1–1 draw (and saw Eritrea's first ever goal in a World Cup qualification match), but Rwanda took the second leg by a score of 3–1.

Recent years have seen a high number of refugees leaving Eritrea, and some athletes travelling to competitions abroad have taken the opportunity to abscond. In December 2012, 17 Eritrean footballers and the team's doctor vanished after the CECAFA championship tournament in Uganda and all applied for asylum in the country.
Four players of Red Sea FC defected after a CAF Champions League 2006 match in Nairobi, Kenya, and up to 12 members of the national side after the 2007 CECAFA Cup in Tanzania. Another 6 players sought asylum in Angola in March 2007 after a group 6 qualifying game for the 2008 Africa Cup of Nations. Three more players from the national team sought asylum in Sudan.

Eritrea withdrew from the 2008 CECAFA Cup, and from the common qualifying tournament shared by the 2010 World Cup and the 2010 Africa Cup of Nations. Given the number of players seeking asylum, the Eritrean government began requiring athletes to pay a 100,000 nakfa surety before traveling abroad.

Eritrea returned to the 2009 CECAFA Cup in Nairobi. A young squad was assembled with just 12 days' training. In Group B, they gained a surprise draw with Zimbabwe, lost narrowly to Rwanda, and beat Somalia 3–1. They were easily beaten 4–0 in the quarter-finals by Tanzania.  Twelve squad members failed to report for the return flight, and sought the assistance of the Refugee Consortium of Kenya. They were believed to be in hiding in Eastleigh, an eastern suburb of Nairobi home to many immigrants. Nicholas Musonye, the secretary-general of CECAFA, feared that the government might react by refusing to let the team travel abroad in future. The twelve players were later granted interim asylum by the United Nations High Commissioner for Refugees in Kenya. Eleven of these players have since travelled to Adelaide in Australia with two of them, Samuel Ghebrehiwet and Ambes Sium, signing for Gold Coast United in the A-League in August 2011.

In the first round of the qualifiers for the 2018 World Cup, ten players from the Eritrean football team refused to return home after playing a World Cup qualifying match in Botswana and were granted asylum there.

In September 2019, four members of the national Under-20 team sought asylum in Uganda after the team qualified for the semi-finals of a competition. A few months later in December, a further seven players selected for the international team refused to return home and sought asylum in Uganda after a tournament.  In October 2021, five footballers from the country's under-20 women's team also disappeared when on international duty in Uganda.

Results and fixtures

2022

Coaching history

 Tekie Abraha (1991–1996)
 Mushir Osman (1998–1999)
 Tekie Abraha (1999–2000)
 Yılmaz Yücetürk (2000–2002)
 Negash Teklit (2002, caretaker)
 Vojo Gardasevic (2002)
 Tekie Abraha (2003)
 Mrad Abdul Tesfay (2004)
 Dorian Marin (2006–2007)
 René Feller (2007–2008)
 Negash Teklit (2009–2012)
 Omar Ahmed Hussein (2013–2015)
 Alemseged Efrem (2015–present)

Players

Current squad
The following players were selected for the 2022 FIFA World Cup qualifiers against Namibia on 10 September 2019.

Caps and goals correct as of 10 September 2019, after the match against Namibia.

Recent call ups

Player records

Players in bold are still active with Eritrea.

Most capped players

Top goalscorers

Competition records

FIFA World Cup

Africa Cup of Nations

CECAFA Cup

All-time record 
Key

 Pld = Matches played
 W = Matches won
 D = Matches drawn
 L = Matches lost

 GF = Goals for
 GA = Goals against
 GD = Goal differential
 Countries are listed in alphabetical order

As of 25 January 2020

References

External links
Eritrea Official
Eritrea on FIFA.com
Fixtures and results
Ranking history

 
African national association football teams